The 2021–22 Dynamo Moscow season was the club's 99th season and fifth season back in the Russian Premier League, following their promotion in 2016–17.

Season events

Squad

Out on loan

Transfers

In

Out

Loans out

Released

Friendlies

Competitions

Overview

Premier League

League table

Results summary

Results by round

Results

Russian Cup

Round of 32

Knockout stage

Final

Squad statistics

Appearances and goals

|-
|colspan="14"|Players away from the club on loan:

|-
|colspan="14"|Players who left Dynamo Moscow during the season:

|}

Goal scorers

Clean sheets

Disciplinary record

References

FC Dynamo Moscow seasons
Dynamo Moscow